Matthew Alexander may refer to:
 Matthew Alexander (writer), pseudonymous author of the book How to Break a Terrorist (2008) and Kill or Capture (2011)
 Matthew Alexander (footballer) (born 2002), English League One football player
 Matthew Alexander (video game designer), co-designer of the Apple game Hard Hat Mack
 Matt Alexander (born 1947), retired Major League baseball player
 Matt Alexander (rugby union) (born 1966), South African rugby union player

See also